Zwartewaterland is a municipality in the province Overijssel in the eastern Netherlands.

Geography 
This mainly rural municipality lies south of Steenwijkerland on the Zwarte Water (Black Water). This is a short tributary of the river IJssel from Zwolle to the Zwarte Meer (Black Lake). Before 1931 this lake was a part of the Zuiderzee. The Vecht also flows into the Zwarte Water. 

Genemuiden and Zwartsluis lie 5 km further north, almost opposite one another, near the Zwarte Water. Aquatic sport tourism is important to the local economy.

Population centres 
The most important places are printed in bold type.

 Cellemuiden
 De Velde
 Genemuiden (population on 1 January 2007: 9,985)
 Hasselt, Overijssel, Netherlands (pop. 6,963)
 Kamperzeedijk-Oost
 Kamperzeedijk-West
 Kievitsnest
 Mastenbroek
 Zwartewatersklooster
 Zwartsluis (pop. 4,810).

Hasselt and Zwartsluis have small ports with some industry. Genemuiden is the biggest of the three towns, and is home to the majority of Zwartewaterland's population and industry.

Sights 
 A small part of the wetland area and National Park "De Wieden" (see Steenwijkerland) lies here, immediately north of Zwartsluis
 Genemuiden has a big yacht basin, Zwartsluis a smaller one.
 The centre of Hasselt is picturesque, with a town hall built between 1550 and 1615 and several old houses (1650-1800).
 Saint Stephen's Church in the centre of Hasselt is interesting. This church, Late Gothic, built in 1466, has frescoes on the ceilings and a remarkable church organ. Every year on the feast of Corpus Christi a Roman Catholic pilgrimage to Hasselt is held, with a procession. For that purpose a special church was built in 1933.

Notable people 

 Kiliaen van Rensselaer (1586 in Hasselt – ca.1643) diamond and pearl merchant, co-founder of the Dutch West India Company
 Jan de Koning (1926 in Zwartsluis – 1994) politician
 Jaap Drupsteen (born 1942 in Hasselt) graphic designer
 Eelco Gelling (born 1946 in Zwartsluis) blues guitarist
 Afke Schaart (born 1973 in Zwartsluis) former politician

Sport 
 Gerard Nijboer (born 1955 in Hasselt) former long-distance runner, competed in three consecutive Summer Olympics
 Willeke Knol (born 1991 in Hasselt) racing cyclist
 Pascal Eenkhoorn (born 1997 in Genemuiden) cyclist

Gallery

References

External links

Official website

 
Kop van Overijssel
Municipalities of Overijssel
Municipalities of the Netherlands established in 2001